Omak Lake is a saline endorheic lake in the U.S. state of Washington, within the Greater Omak Area.

The name Omak comes from the Okanogan placename [umák].

Omak Lake occupies a former channel of the Columbia River.  The Okanagan people once believed that Omak Lake was inhabited by spirits, and avoided the area.

References

External links
Oxygen-Temperature Profiles For Omak Lake
Omak Lake Nutrient, Primary Productivity and Alkalinity Data
USGS Omak Lake Quad, Washington

Lakes of Washington (state)
Endorheic lakes of the United States
Lakes of Okanogan County, Washington
Washington placenames of Native American origin